Satoko Kuroki (born 1986) is a Japanese team handball player. She plays on the Japanese national team, and participated at the 2011 World Women's Handball Championship in Brazil.

References

1986 births
Living people
Japanese female handball players
Place of birth missing (living people)